Uganda Army may refer to:

 Uganda Army (1962–1971), the country's first post-independence armed forces
 Uganda Army (1971–1980), the country's armed forces during the rule of Idi Amin until 1979 when it became a rebel group
 Former Uganda National Army, a rebel group that claimed to be the continuation of the 1971–1980 Uganda Army
 Uganda National Liberation Army, formed as rebel group in 1979 and acted as the country's official armed forces until 1986
 Uganda People's Defence Force, the current national armed forces of Uganda